(October 31, 1929 – August 4, 2004) was a Japanese actor most known for his work with Japanese New Wave director Nagisa Oshima. He was born in Tokyo and graduated from the University of Tokyo before joining the Shōchiku studio in 1956.

Selected filmography

Seishun no oto (1954)
Izumi (1956)
Sora yukaba (1957) - Tetsuo Sakai
Aijo no keifu (1957) - Tatsumi Furuse
Aoi hana no nagare (1957) - Taisuke Kojô
Black River (1957) - Nishida
Yoku (1958) - Katsuhiko Mochida
Equinox Flower (1958) - Ichiro Nagamura
Me no kabe (1958)
Kawaki (1958)
Ari no machi no Maria (1958)
Cruel Story of Youth (1960)
 The Sun's Burial (1960)
Late Autumn (1960)
Violence at Noon (1966)
Tales of the Ninja (Band of Ninja) (1967)
Ceremony of Disbanding (1967)
Shogun's Joys of Torture (1968)
Death by Hanging (1968)
Three Resurrected Drunkards (1968)
Boy (1969)
Bloodstained Clan Honor (1970)
The Ceremony (1971)
Female Convict 701: Scorpion (1972)
Lone Wolf and Cub: Sword of Vengeance (子連れ狼　子を貸し腕貸しつかまつる Kozure Ōkami: Kowokashi udekashi tsukamatsuru) (1972)
Female Convict Scorpion: Jailhouse 41 (1973)
Never Give Up (1978)
Tokyo Blackout (1987)

Television
 Taikōki (1965), Takeda Katsuyori
 Daitsuiseki (1978)

Personal life

He was a friend of C. W. Nicol.

References

External links

Japanese male film actors
People from Tokyo
University of Tokyo alumni
20th-century Japanese male actors
Japanese male television actors
1929 births
2004 deaths